Mantorp Park is a  motor racing circuit near the town of Mantorp in Mjölby Municipality, Sweden. The circuit was built in 1969 with finance from BP Sweden as a permanent road course and a drag strip. Mantorp Park is capable of four different layouts, but today only the short and long tracks are used.

The European Formula Two Championship visited from 1971 until 1973, and again in 1981 and 1982. Today it mainly hosts club events, dragracing, a driving school and rounds of the Swedish Formula Three Championship and the Swedish Touring Car Championship.

Mantorp Park was the first European drag racing circuit to adopt the new  drag strip (about 3/16 mile) format adopted by the NHRA in July 2008.

Lap records 

The fastest official race lap records at the Mantorp Park are listed as:

Notes

References

External links
 
Track info from STCC official Website 

Motorsport venues in Sweden
Drag racing venues in Europe
Buildings and structures in Östergötland County